Holy Water is the ninth studio album by the English hard rock band Bad Company, and their third with Brian Howe as lead vocalist. The album was released on 12 June 1990. It went platinum, selling over 1,000,000 units, and climbed to No. 35 on The Billboard Top Pop Albums chart. The first single, "Holy Water", was a No. 1 Billboard Album Rock Track for two weeks during the summer of 1990 as the band toured the United States with Damn Yankees. The single "If You Needed Somebody" became a major hit in early 1991, reaching No. 16 on the Billboard Hot 100 and No. 2 on the Album Rock Tracks chart. "Boys Cry Tough" (#3), "Stranger, Stranger" (#9) and "Walk Through Fire" (#28 Hot 100 / #14 Album Rock Tracks) also received substantial airplay.

Track listing
All songs written by Brian Howe and Terry Thomas, except where noted.

Personnel
Bad Company
 Brian Howe – lead vocals
 Mick Ralphs – guitars
 Simon Kirke – drums; lead vocals and acoustic guitar on "100 Miles"
Additional personnel
 Felix Krish – bass
 Terry Thomas - guitars, backing vocals, Hammond organ, percussion
 Lea Hart — backing vocals
 Tina Egan — additional backing vocals on "If You Needed Somebody"
 Rick Smith — accordion on "100 Miles"
 Paul Cullen- bass player during the tour. Also seen in the Holy Water Music Video

Charts

References

Bad Company albums
1990 albums
Atco Records albums